Central Scots is a group of dialects of Scots.
 
Central Scots is spoken from Fife and Perthshire to the Lothians and Wigtownshire, often split into North East Central Scots (Northeast Mid Scots) and South East Central Scots (Southeast Mid Scots), West Central Scots (West Mid Scots) and South West Central Scots (Southwest Mid Scots).

Like other varieties of Scots, Central Scots has been undergoing  a process of language attrition, whereby successive generations of speakers have adopted more and more features from Standard English. By the end of the twentieth century Scots was at an advanced stage of language death over much of Lowland Scotland.<ref>Macafee C. "Studying Scots Vocabulary in Corbett, John; McClure, Derrick; Stuart-Smith, Jane (Editors)(2003) The Edinburgh Companion to Scots. Edinburgh, Edinburgh University Press. . p. 51</ref>

Phonology

Consonants
Most consonants are usually pronounced much as in English but:
 ch is traditionally realised  in, for example, bocht (bought), coch (cough), dochter (daughter), focht (fought), socht (sought ) and troch (trough).
ng: is always .
nch: usually . brainch (branch), dunch (push), etc.
t: may be a glottal stop between vowels or word final.
wh: usually , older .

Vowels
Vowel length is usually conditioned by the Scottish Vowel Length Rule (SVLR).

a (vowel 17) is usually  but to the north and east   also occurs. Note final a (vowel 12) in awa (away), twa (two) and wha (who) is usually realised  South of the Forth, often written awae, twae and whae in dialect writing.
 ai, ay and a (consonant)e, ae (vowel 4 or 8) are usually realised ,  for example baith (both), braid (broad), cake, claes (clothes), grape (grope), kail (cole), laid (load), laif (loaf), made, raip (rope), saip (soap), spae (foretell). South of the Forth the initial realisation is often , for example acre, aik (oak), aits, (oats), ale, ane (one) and ance (once) often written yicker, yick, yits, yill, yin and yince in dialect writing. Where that occurs, ae (one-before nouns) is realised , often written yae in dialect writing.
 e (vowel 16) is usually realised , for example bed, het (heated), yett (gate), etc.
With   prevailing in the south east and west and  prevailing in the north east of the dialect area. Before ,  may occur. For example deid (dead), heid (head), meat (food), clear etc.
ee (vowels 2 and 11), e (Consonant)e (vowel 2). Occasionally ei and ie  with ei generally before ch, but also in a few other words, and ie generally occurring before l and v.  The realisation is generally   e.g. dree (endure), ee (eye), een (eyes), flee (fly), here, lee (lie, fib), see, speir (enquire), steek (shut), thee (thigh) and tree etc. The digraph ea also occurs in a few words such as  lea and  sea.
oa (vowel 5) is usually .
ou the general literary spelling of vowel 6, also u (consonant)e in some words, is realised , often represented by oo, a 19th-century borrowing from Standard English.  e.g. cou (cow), broun (brown), hoose (house), moose (mouse) etc.
ow, owe (root final), (vowel 13) is usually    in bowe (bow), howe (hollow), knowe (knoll), cowp (overturn), yowe (ewe), etc. Vocalisation to  often occurs before , for example bowk (retch), howk (dig) often written boak and hoak in dialect writing.
ui, the usual literary spelling of vowel 7 (except before  and  see eu). Note that  v. and  n.

See also
Glasgow patter
Berwick-upon-Tweed#Berwick dialect

References

Scots dialects
Fife
Clackmannanshire
Perth and Kinross
Stirling (council area)
Falkirk (council area)
East Dunbartonshire
West Dunbartonshire
Culture in Glasgow
Renfrewshire
Inverclyde
East Renfrewshire
North Lanarkshire
South Lanarkshire
West Lothian
Culture in Edinburgh
Midlothian
East Lothian
North Ayrshire
East Ayrshire
South Ayrshire
Galloway